RajasahebPet is a small village in Kadapa district of the Indian state of Andhra Pradesh.It is located in Porumamilla mandal of Rajampeta revenue division.

Education facilities 
There is an elementary school in RajasahebPet. Zilla Parishad High School is a high school for studying high school near Tekurpeta

Medical facilities 
  The village has a primary health center for healing near Tekurpeta

References 
1 .rajasahebpet village map in wikimapia RajasahebPet village

Villages in Kadapa district